

306001–306100 

|-id=019
| 306019 Duren ||  || Riley Duren (born 1968) is an American systems engineer who studies climate change. || 
|-id=020
| 306020 Kormilov ||  || Sergei I. Kormilov (1951–2020) was a Russian literary historian and theorist, a Doctor of Philology, a Professor of Moscow University, and an author of educational books and about 800 scientific papers. || 
|}

306101–306200

|-id=128
| 306128 Pipher ||  || Judith Pipher (1940–2022) was a Canadian-American astrophysicist and professor at the University of Rochester. || 
|}

306201–306300 

|-bgcolor=#f2f2f2
| colspan=4 align=center | 
|}

306301–306400 

|-id=367
| 306367 Nut || 5025 P-L || Nut, a goddess of the heavens in the old Egyptian religion. With Geb, the god of Earth, she gave birth to the god Osiris. || 
|}

306401–306500 

|-id=479
| 306479 Tyburhoe ||  || Ty Burhoe (born 1964) is a tabla player, composer, producer, and teacher whose wide-ranging musical collaborations have opened new stylistic frontiers for the tabla. His generosity sharing his explorations of the instrument has inspired many people to learn the tabla as a path for self-discovery and collaborative creation. || 
|}

306501–306600 

|-bgcolor=#f2f2f2
| colspan=4 align=center | 
|}

306601–306700 

|-bgcolor=#f2f2f2
| colspan=4 align=center | 
|}

306701–306800 

|-bgcolor=#f2f2f2
| colspan=4 align=center | 
|}

306801–306900 

|-bgcolor=#f2f2f2
| colspan=4 align=center | 
|}

306901–307000 

|-bgcolor=#f2f2f2
| colspan=4 align=center | 
|}

References 

306001-307000